The 2012 Indonesian Masters Grand Prix Gold was the tenth grand prix gold and grand prix tournament of the 2012 BWF Grand Prix Gold and Grand Prix. The tournament was held in Palembang Sport and Convention Center, Palembang, South Sumatra, Indonesia September 25 until September 30, 2012 and had a total purse of $120,000.

Men's singles

Seeds

  Simon Santoso (quarter-final)
  Sho Sasaki (quarter-final)
  Tommy Sugiarto (quarter-final)
  Dionysius Hayom Rumbaka (final)
  Sony Dwi Kuncoro (champion)
  Alamsyah Yunus (semi-final)
  Mohd Arif Abdul Latif (quarter-final)
  Andre Kurniawan Tedjono (second round)
  Ramdan Misbun (third round)
  Chan Kwong Beng (withdrew)
  Zulfadli Zulkiffli (third round)
  Hong Ji-hoon (third round)
  Goh Soon Huat (third round)
  Iskandar Zulkarnain Zainuddin (third round)
  Andrew Smith (third round)
  Chen Yuekun (third round)

Finals

Top half

Section 1

Section 2

Section 3

Section 4

Bottom half

Section 5

Section 6

Section 7

Section 8

Women's singles

Seeds

  Liu Xin (first round)
  Han Li (champion)
  Xing Aiying (second round)
  Bellaetrix Manuputty (first round)
  Maria Febe Kusumastuti (first round)
  Aprilia Yuswandari (quarter-final)
  Adriyanti Firdasari (semi-final)
  Hera Desi (quarter-final)

Finals

Top half

Section 1

Section 2

Bottom half

Section 3

Section 4

Men's doubles

Seeds

  Mohammad Ahsan / Bona Septano (withdrew)
  Hirokatsu Hashimoto / Noriyasu Hirata (first round)
  Kim Ki-jung / Kim Sa-rang (champion)
  Angga Pratama / Ryan Agung Saputra (final)
  Hoon Thien How / Tan Wee Kiong (first round)
  Mohd Zakry Abdul Latif / Mohd Fairuzizuan Mohd Tazari (first round)
  Ricky Karanda Suwardi / Muhammad Ulinnuha (second round)
  Markus Fernaldi Gideon / Agripinna Prima Rahmanto Putra (quarter-final)

Finals

Top half

Section 1

Section 2

Bottom half

Section 3

Section 4

Women's doubles

Seeds

  Misaki Matsutomo / Ayaka Takahashi (champion)
  Eom Hye-won / Jang Ye-na (final)
  Anneke Feinya Agustin / Nitya Krishinda Maheswari (quarter-final)
  Vivian Hoo Kah Mun / Woon Khe Wei (first round)
  Vita Marissa / Nadya Melati (second round)
  Pia Zebadiah Bernadeth / Rizki Amelia Pradipta (semi-final)
  Koharu Yonemoto / Yuriko Miki (second round)
  Suci Rizki Andini / Della Destiara Haris (quarter-final)

Finals

Top half

Section 1

Section 2

Bottom half

Section 3

Section 4

Mixed doubles

Seeds

  Tontowi Ahmad / Lilyana Natsir (champion)
  Muhammad Rijal / Debby Susanto (final)
  Danny Bawa Chrisnanta / Vanessa Neo Yu Yan (quarter-final)
  Fran Kurniawan / Shendy Puspa Irawati (second round)
  Irfan Fadhilah / Weni Anggraini (second round)
  Kim Ki-jung / Jang Ye-na (first round)
  Riky Widianto / Richi Puspita Dili (quarter-final)
  Kim Sa-rang / Eom Hye-won (semi-final)

Finals

Top half

Section 1

Section 2

Bottom half

Section 3

Section 4

References

Indonesian Masters (badminton)
Indonesia
2012 in Indonesian sport
Sport in Palembang